Null Island is the point on Earth's surface at zero degrees latitude and zero degrees longitude, i.e., where the prime meridian and the equator intersect. Null Island is located in international waters in the Atlantic Ocean, roughly 600 km off the coast of West Africa, in the Gulf of Guinea. The exact point, using the WGS84 datum, is marked by the Soul buoy (named after the musical genre), a permanently-moored weather buoy.

The term "Null Island" jokingly refers to a fictional place at that location, and to a common cartographic placeholder name to which coordinates erroneously set to 0,0 are assigned in placename databases in order to more easily find and fix them. Although Null Island started as a joke within the geospatial community, its existence has both technological and social implications that promote Null Island as a recurring issue in geographic information science.

In software 

In terms of computing and placename databases, the coordinates for Null Island were added to the Natural Earth public domain map dataset –2011, after which the term came into wide use (although there is evidence of it being used previously). Since then, the "island" has through fiction been given a geography, history, and flag. Natural Earth describes the entity as a "1 meter square island" with "scale rank 100, indicating it should never be shown in mapping". The name "Null" refers to the two zero coordinates, as null values (indicating an absence of data) are often coerced to a value of 0 when converted to an integer context or "no-nulls allowed" context.

The location is used by mapping systems to trap errors. Such errors arise, for example, where an image artifact is erroneously associated to the location by software which cannot attribute a geoposition, and instead associates a latitude and longitude of "Null,Null" or "0,0". As reported in January 2018 by Bellingcat, other data mapped to the location include activity events from the Strava fitness-tracking app, apparently mapped to the location due to users entering "0,0" coordinates to disguise their real locations.

Soul buoy
A weather and sea observation buoy is moored at the Null Island location. The buoy ("Station 13010 – Soul") is part of the PIRATA system, a set of 17 buoys installed in the tropical Atlantic Ocean since 1997 by the United States, France, and Brazil. Like the other buoys in the system, it is named after a musical genre. It is an ATLAS (Autonomous Temperature Line Acquisition System) buoy, autonomous, conical-shaped and 3.8 m high. It is anchored by a cable to the seabed. It measures the following:

 Wind speed and direction
 Air temperature
 Precipitation
 Humidity
 Solar radiation
 Pressure, temperature and conductivity up to 500 m below the surface.

The buoy disappeared less than a year after its installation, and was replaced in 1998.

See also
 Colonel Bleep – a 1957 cartoon that took place on the fictitious "Zero Zero Island" (i.e., Null Island), where Earth's equator meets the Greenwich Meridian
 MaxMind, an Internet geolocation company that by default set 600 million IP addresses to a farmhouse in Kansas
 Royal Observatory, Greenwich – located due north of Null Island

References

External links
 

Extreme points of Earth
Fictional islands
Internet memes
Gulf of Guinea